The Arvin J. Alexander Memorial is a 1991 memorial commemorating the lawyer and politician of the same name by Carl Faehnle, installed in Columbus, Ohio's Alexander AEP Park, in the United States.

Description and history
The abstract pink granite memorial features three angular elements, one of which has a metal plaque with the inscription: 

The center element is polished and the other two have a matte finish.

The piece was surveyed by the Smithsonian Institution's "Save Outdoor Sculpture!" program in 1992.

See also

 1991 in art

References

1991 establishments in Ohio
1991 sculptures
Abstract sculptures in the United States
Downtown Columbus, Ohio
Granite sculptures in Ohio
Monuments and memorials in Ohio
Outdoor sculptures in Columbus, Ohio